Cyperus brunnescens is a species of sedge that is endemic to parts of south east Asia.

The species was first formally described by the botanist Johann Otto Boeckeler in 1890.

See also
 List of Cyperus species

References

brunnescens
Taxa named by Johann Otto Boeckeler
Plants described in 1890
Flora of India
Flora of Vietnam